Community-supported agriculture (CSA model) or cropsharing is a system that connects producers and consumers within the food system closer by allowing the consumer to subscribe to the harvest of a certain farm or group of farms. It is an alternative socioeconomic model of agriculture and food distribution that allows the producer and consumer to share the risks of farming. The model is a subcategory of civic agriculture that has an overarching goal of strengthening a sense of community through local markets.

In return for subscribing to a harvest, subscribers receive either a weekly or bi-weekly box of produce or other farm goods. This includes in-season fruits, vegetables, and can expand to dried goods, eggs, milk, meat, etc. Typically, farmers try to cultivate a relationship with subscribers by sending weekly letters of what is happening on the farm, inviting them for harvest, or holding an open-farm event. Some CSAs provide for contributions of labor in lieu of a portion of subscription costs.

The term CSA is mostly used in the United States and Canada, but a variety of similar production and economic sub-systems are in use worldwide, in Austria and Germany as Solidarische Landwirtschaft ("solidarity farming") and in the UK mainly in the vegetable box scheme.

History

The term "community-supported agriculture" was coined in the northeastern United States in the 1980s, influenced by European biodynamic agriculture ideas formulated by Rudolf Steiner. Two European farmers, Jan Vander Tuin from Switzerland and Trauger Groh from Germany, brought European biodynamic farming ideas to the United States in the mid-1980s. Vander Tuin had co-founded a community-supported agricultural project named Topinambur located near Zurich, Switzerland. Coinage of the term "community-supported agriculture" stems from Vander Tuin. This influence led to the separate and simultaneous creation of two CSAs in 1986. The CSA Garden at Great Barrington was created in Massachusetts by Jan Vander Tuin, Susan Witt, and Robyn Van En.  The Temple-Wilton Community Farm was created in New Hampshire by Anthony Graham, Trauger Groh, and Lincoln Geiger.

The CSA Garden at Great Barrington remained together until 1990 when many members left to form the Mahaiwe Harvest CSA. One of the original founders, Robyn Van En, became incredibly influential in the CSA movement in America and founded CSA North America in 1992. The Temple-Wilton Community Garden was more successful and still operates as a CSA today. It became an important member of the Wilton community and it receives funding from state, federal, and local sources.

A parallel model called Teikei existed in Japan as early as the mid-1960s. Similarly, Dr. Booker T. Whatley, a professor of agriculture in Alabama, advocated for Clientele Membership Clubs as early as the 1960s.

Since the 1980s, community supported farms have been organized throughout North America—mainly in New England, the Northwest, the Pacific coast, the Upper-Midwest and Canada. North America now has at least 13,000 CSA farms of which 12,549 are in the US according to the United States Department of Agriculture in 2007. The rise of CSAs seems to be correlated with the increase in awareness of the environmental movement in the United States. CSAs have even become popular in urban environments such as the New York City Coalition Against Hunger's CSA program that helps serve under-served communities. One of the largest subscription CSAs was Capay Inc. in Capay Valley, California which in 2010 delivered boxes to 13,000 customers a week as well as selling at 15 farmers markets, operating a retail store, and delivering special orders to restaurants.

Urgenci, based in France, helps network together consumers and producers across Europe, the Mediterranean, and West Africa.

CSA was introduced to China following a series of food safety scandals in the late 2000s. It was estimated that there were more than 500 CSA farms in China by 2017. They have been a critical force in the development of the organic and ecological farming in China. Chinese CSA farmers, researchers and civil society organizations gather annually at the national CSA symposium held since 2009.

Much of the growth in women labour participation in agriculture is outside the "male dominated field of conventional agriculture". In community supported agriculture women represent 40 percent of farm operators.

International 
Even if the systems of community-supported agriculture vary in different countries, there are a number of umbrella-organizations connecting the farms. In the United States the governmental program SARE offered grants for research and education projects that advance sustainable agricultural practices like CSA.

In Germany and Austria the CSA groups founded the Bundesnetzwerk Solidarische Landwirtschaft (Federal Network of CSA-farms) in 2011.

Socio-economic model 
CSAs create direct connections between producers and consumers through alternative markets and the members and farmers share the risk of farming.  The goals of the first CSA model in the US were to have the producer and consumer to come into the market as equals and make an exchange with fair prices and fair wages.

The consumer pays for things such as transparency, environmental stewardship, producer relationships, etc. The farmers engaged in CSAs do so to fulfill goals other than income and are not compensated fairly in these exchanges. This kind of market holds "economic rents" where the consumer surplus comes from the consumers' willingness to pay for something further than the product as well as for the products inputs themselves. Although these markets still exist within a larger capitalist economy, they are able to exist because of the "economic rents" that are collected.

CSA system
CSAs generally focus on the production of high quality foods for a local community, often using organic or biodynamic farming methods, and a shared risk membership–marketing structure. This kind of farming operates with a much greater degree of involvement of consumers and other stakeholders than usual—resulting in a stronger consumer-producer relationship. The core design includes developing a cohesive consumer group that is willing to fund a whole season's budget in order to get quality foods. The system has many variations on how the farm budget is supported by the consumers and how the producers then deliver the foods. CSA theory purports that the more a farm embraces whole-farm, whole-budget support, the more it can focus on quality and reduce the risk of food waste.

Structure
Community-supported agriculture farms in the United States today share three common characteristics: an emphasis on community and/or local produce, share or subscriptions sold prior to season, and weekly deliveries to members/subscribers. Though CSA operation varies from farm to farm and has evolved over time, these three characteristics have remained constant. The functioning of a CSA also relies on four practical arrangements: for farmers to know the needs of a community, for consumers to have the opportunity to express to farmers what their needs and financial limitations are, for commitments between farmers and consumers to be consciously established, and for farmers needs to be recognized.

From this base, four main types of CSAs have been developed:

 Farmer managed: A farmer sets up and maintains a CSA, recruits subscribers, and controls management of the CSA.
 Shareholder/subscriber: Local residents set up a CSA and hire a farmer to grow crops, and shareholders/subscribers control most management.
 Farmer cooperative: Multiple farmers develop a CSA program.
 Farmer-shareholder cooperative: Farmers and local residents set up and cooperatively manage a CSA.

In most original CSAs, a core group of members existed.  This core group of members helped to make decisions about and run the CSA including marketing, distribution, administrative, and community organization functions.  CSAs with a core group of members are most profitable and successful.  However, in 1999, 72 percent of CSAs did not have a core group of members.  CSAs with a core group of members operate more successfully as a farmer-shareholder cooperative and CSAs without a group of core members rely much more on subscriptions and run most prominently as shareholder/subscriber CSAs.

Ideology

Community-supported agriculture in America was influenced by the ideas of Rudolf Steiner, an Austrian philosopher. He developed the concepts of anthroposophy and biodynamic agriculture. The Temple-Wilton Community Farm used his ideas to develop three main goals of CSAs:

 New forms of property ownership: the idea that land should be held in common by a community through a legal trust, which leases the land to farmers
 New forms of cooperation: the idea that a network of human relationships should replace the traditional system of employers and employees
 New forms of economy: that the economy should not be based on increasing profit, but should be based on the actual needs of the people and land involved in an enterprise

As CSAs have increased in both number and size since they were first developed, they have also changed ideologically.  While original CSAs and some more current CSAs are still philosophically oriented, most CSAs today are commercially oriented and community-supported agriculture is predominantly seen as a beneficial marketing strategy. This has led to three ideologically based types of CSAs.  The first type is instrumental, the CSA is considered a market in the traditional sense, instead of an alternative form of economy and relationship. The second type is functional; there is a relationship of solidarity between the farmer and the subscribers, but this extends mostly to social functions, not managerial or administrative functions. This is the most common type of CSA.  The final type is collaborative; this is the closest to the original aims of CSAs where the relationship between the farmer and the subscribers is seen as a partnership.

Distribution and marketing methods

Shares of a CSA originally and predominantly consist of produce. In more recent years, shares have diversified and include non-produce products including eggs, meat, flowers, honey, dairy and soaps.  Share prices vary from CSA to CSA.  Shares are sold as full shares, which feed 2 to 5 people, and half shares, which feed 1 to 3 people.  Prices range from $200 to $500 per season.  Full shares are sold at a median of $400 and half shares are sold at a median of $250.  Share prices are mostly determined by overhead costs of production, but are also determined by share prices of other CSAs, variable costs of production, market forces, and income level of the community. Many CSAs have payment plans and low-income options.

Shares are distributed in several different ways.  Shares are most often distributed weekly. Most CSAs allow share pick up at the farm.  Shares are also distributed through regional dropoff, direct home or office dropoff, farmers' markets, and community center/church dropoff. For example, the new "Farmie Markets" of upstate New York take orders online and have a number of farmers who send that week's orders to a central point in a limited region, for distribution by the organizers.

CSAs market their farms and shares in different ways.  CSAs employ different channels of marketing to diversify their sales efforts and increase subscriptions.  CSAs use local farmers' markets, restaurants, on-farm retail, wholesale to natural food stores, and wholesale to local groceries in addition to their CSAs to market shares. One problem that CSAs encounter is over-production, so CSAs often sell their produce and products in ways other than shares. Often, CSA farms also sell their products at local farmers' markets. Excess products are sometimes given to food banks.

Challenges for farmers 
Many CSA farmers can capitalize on a closer relationship between customers and their food, since some customers will pay more (an economic rent if this puts the price above the cost of production) if they know where it is coming from, who is involved, and have special access to it. However, some farmers participating in community-supported agriculture do not experience the economic benefits that they are perceived to obtain by participating in an alternative community-based arrangement. Galt's 2013 study of CSA farmers found that many farmers charged lower fees and prices for their goods than would provide them with financial security. This study suggested that farmers may charge less than they need to earn fair wages due to undervaluing their expenses and to offset the high costs of CSA products and make it more affordable for customers; see moral economy.

See also
 Agrarian socialism
 Civic agriculture
 Common land
 Communalism
 Community land trust
 Community supported fishery
 Community wealth building
 Development-supported agriculture
 Farmers' market
 Local food
 Sustainable agriculture
 Slow food
 Worker cooperative
 WWOOF

References

Further reading 
 Bryant, Greg. (1992). "Community Supported Agriculture," RAIN magazine 14(2), Winter/Spring.
 Cone, C. A., & Myhre, A. (2000). Community-Supported Agriculture: A Sustainable Alternative to Industrial Agriculture? Human Organization 59(2), 187–197.
 DeMuth, Suzanne. (1993). "Community Supported Agriculture (CSA): An Annotated Bibliography and Resource Guide", September.
 Egan, Timothy. (2003). "Amid Dying Towns of Rural Plains, One Makes a Stand," New York Times, December 1.
 En, Robyn Van. (1995). "Eating for Your Community: A Report from the Founder of Community Supported Agriculture," Context, Fall, p, 29.
 Greenwood, Deborah, and Robin Leichenko. (2012). "Community-Supported Agriculture." In Danto, William, ed., Food and Famine in the 21st Century, Santa Barbara: ABC-CLIO, 86–94.
 Groh, Trauger, and Steven McFadden. (1990). Farms of Tomorrow: Community Supported Farms - Farm Supported Communities. Biodynamic Farming and Gardening Association
 Groh, Trauger, and Steven McFadden. (1998). Farms of Tomorrow Revisited: Community Supported Farms - Farm Supported Communities. Biodynamic Farming and Gardening Association.
 What is a CSA, HarvestHand (2014). "Community Shared Agriculture," HarvestHand- What is a CSA.
 Kumar, S., Duell, J., Soergell, A., & Ali, R. (2011). Towards direct marketing of produce by farmers in India: Lessons from the United States of America. Journal of International Development, 23(4), 539–547. doi:10.1002/jid.1600
 Lawson, Jered. (1993). "Cabbages and Compassion", RAIN magazine 14(3), Spring.
 McFadden, Steven. (2011). The Call of the Land: An Agrarian Primer for the 21st Century, 2nd ed. NorLights Press.
 McFadden, Steven (2015). "Awakening Community Intelligence: CSA Farms as Community Cornerstones" (Soul*Sparks Books).
 Organic Gardening. (1984). "Produce by Subscription," April.
 Organic Gardening. (1986). "From Farms to Families," July.
 Speth, James Gustav. (2008). The bridge at the edge of the world. New Haven: Yale University Press.
 Time. (2003). “Fresh Off the Farm, A new breed of planters and eaters are joining forces to nurture the local-foods movement,”, November. 3.
 VanderTuin, Jan. (1992). "Zürich Supported Agriculture", RAIN magazine 14(2), Winter/Spring.
 Member Assembler (2015). "CSA Models - The Comprehensive guide to CSA Distribution Models and Fundamental Questions to ask when developing a CSA model".

External links 
 Find a local CSA (localharvest.org)

Urban agriculture
Agriculture in the United States
Agroecology
Agricultural economics
Agricultural labor
Rural community development
Community development
Community organizations
Organic farming
Agricultural cooperatives
Consumers' cooperatives
Sustainable food system
Revenue models